NGC 1283 is an elliptical galaxy located about 250 million light-years away in the constellation Perseus. The galaxy was discovered by astronomer Guillaume Bigourdan on October 23, 1884 and is a member of the Perseus Cluster. It also contains an active galactic nucleus.

See also
 List of NGC objects (1001–2000)

References

External links
 

Perseus Cluster
Perseus (constellation)
Elliptical galaxies
1283
12478 
Astronomical objects discovered in 1884
2676
Active galaxies